The Dalvik Church is a church building at Dalvik in Jönköping, Sweden. It is a Swedish Evangelical Mission church belonging to the Jönköping Sofia-Järstorp Parish of the Church of Sweden, it was inaugurated on 8 February 1969 and expanded in 1985.

Near the Dalvik Church is the "Kyrktuppen Kindergarten", ran by the Church of Sweden.

August 2020 fire
On the night before 1 August 2020, a fire erupted in the kitchen in the basement, and damaged the building. The fire was extinguished before it spread to other parts of the church. The Kindergarten activity could re-start.

References

External links

20th-century Church of Sweden church buildings
Churches in Jönköping
Churches completed in 1969
Swedish Evangelical Mission church buildings
Churches in the Diocese of Växjö
1969 establishments in Sweden